Susanna White (born 1960) is a British television and film director.

Early life
White was born in England in 1960. She first became interested in films at 8 years old, when she visited the set of the BBC children's TV show Crackerjack, and asked her parents to buy her a Super 8 film camera. She read English at Oxford University, and then won a Fulbright scholarship to study film at UCLA.

Career
After graduation, White spent 12 years making documentaries for BBC2. In 1999, she failed to win a place on a BBC training scheme and was turned down for a BBC drama director trainee course. In 2001, she was supported by BBC2 controller Jane Root, who eased her into drama with a £200,000 budget drama for BBC2, Love Again, about Philip Larkin. She won a BAFTA award for best drama serial for her work on the 2005 version of Bleak House. She directed the BBC mini-series Jane Eyre, for which she was nominated for an Emmy award. She also directed four episodes of the HBO miniseries Generation Kill, and all five episodes of the 2012 series Parade's End.

In film, White directed Nanny McPhee and the Big Bang and most recently Our Kind of Traitor.

In June 2021, Deadline Hollywood reported that White would direct episodes of the Disney+ Star Wars series Andor, which were released in 2022.

Personal life
White and her husband, an Oxford academic and part-time dairy farmer, live on a dairy farm in Sussex with their twin daughters, Beatrix and Oriane.

Filmography

Film

Television

References

External links

English film directors
English television directors
English women film directors
British women television directors
Living people
Place of birth missing (living people)
1960 births
Fulbright alumni